Muhammad Afzal  is a Pakistani politician who was a Member of the Provincial Assembly of the Punjab, from 2002 to May 2018.

Early life and education
He was born on 11 October 1964 in Bahawalpur.

He has the degree of the Bachelor of Medicine and Bachelor of Surgery which he obtained in 1988 from Nishtar Medical College.

Political career
He was elected to the Provincial Assembly of the Punjab as a candidate of Pakistan Peoples Party (PPP) from Constituency PP-276 (Bahawalpur-X) in 2002 Pakistani general election. He received 35,989 votes and defeated a candidate of Pakistan Muslim League (Q) (PML-Q).

He was re-elected to the Provincial Assembly of the Punjab as a candidate of PML-Q from Constituency PP-276 (Bahawalpur-X) in 2008 Pakistani general election. He received 30,645 votes and defeated a candidate of Pakistan Muslim League (N).

He was re-elected to the Provincial Assembly of the Punjab as a candidate of PML-Q from Constituency PP-276 (Bahawalpur-X) in 2013 Pakistani general election.

References

Living people
Punjab MPAs 2013–2018
1964 births
Pakistan Muslim League (Q) MPAs (Punjab)
Punjab MPAs 2002–2007
Punjab MPAs 2008–2013